Zurab Aleksandrovich Sakandelidze (9 August 1945 – 25 January 2004) was a Georgian basketball player who won gold with the Soviet basketball team at the 1972 Summer Olympics. He was born in Kutaisi, and played for Dinamo Tbilisi. He died in Tbilisi.

References

Men's basketball players from Georgia (country)
Soviet men's basketball players
1967 FIBA World Championship players
1970 FIBA World Championship players
1945 births
2004 deaths
People from Kutaisi
BC Dinamo Tbilisi players
Olympic basketball players of the Soviet Union
Olympic bronze medalists for the Soviet Union
Olympic gold medalists for the Soviet Union
Basketball players at the 1968 Summer Olympics
Basketball players at the 1972 Summer Olympics
FIBA EuroBasket-winning players
Sportspeople from Kutaisi
Olympic medalists in basketball
Medalists at the 1972 Summer Olympics
Medalists at the 1968 Summer Olympics
FIBA World Championship-winning players
Point guards